Grete Kunz can refer to:

 Grete Kunz (fencer) (born 1908), Austrian fencer
 Grete Kunz (painter) (1909–1991), Czech painter